The salt and ice challenge is an Internet challenge where participants pour salt on their bodies, usually on the arm, and ice is then placed on the salt. This causes a "burning" sensation similar to frost bite, and participants vie to withstand the pain for the longest time. The challenge can be recorded and posted on YouTube or other forms of social media.

The mixture of ice and salt create

The salt and ice challenge can quickly cause second- and third-degree injuries similar to frostbite or being burnt with the metal end of a lighter, as well as causing painful open sores to form on the skin. Due to the numbing sensation of the cold and possible nerve damage during the stunt, participants are often unaware of the extent of any injuries sustained during the challenge, only feeling pain once the salt on their skin enters lesions created during the challenge. Skin discoloration from the challenge may remain after the challenge has been attempted.

References 

Ice

External links 
The salt and ice challenge: Don't let your teen get burned
Experts: Don't Try Salt and Ice Challenge

Challenges
Self-harm